Groupe des écoles nationales d'ingénieurs (Groupe ENI) is French for "Group of French National Engineering Schools",  a network of 4 French public engineering schools that deliver the title of Diplôme d'Ingénieur in a wide variety of fields.

Member institutions 
 École nationale d'ingénieurs de Brest (ENIB)
 École nationale d'ingénieurs de Metz (ENIM)
 École nationale d'ingénieurs de Saint-Etienne (ENISE)
 École nationale d'ingénieurs de Tarbes (ENIT)

See also
Diplôme d'Ingénieur
Grandes écoles
Education in France

References

Engineering universities and colleges in France